The 2002 NCAA Division I Men's Tennis Championships were the 56th annual championships to determine the national champions of NCAA Division I men's singles, doubles, and team collegiate tennis in the United States.

USC defeated defending champions Georgia in the championship final, 4–1, to claim the Trojans' sixteenth team national title.

Host sites
This year's tournaments were played at the George P. Mitchell Tennis Center at Texas A&M University in College Station, Texas. 

The men's and women's tournaments would not be held at the same site until 2006.

See also
NCAA Division II Tennis Championships (Men, Women)
NCAA Division III Tennis Championships (Men, Women)

References

External links
List of NCAA Men's Tennis Champions

NCAA Division I tennis championships
NCAA Division I Men's Tennis Championships
NCAA Division I Men's Tennis Championships
NCAA Division I Men's Tennis Championships